In mathematics, a cyclic polytope, denoted C(n,d), is a convex polytope formed as a convex hull of n distinct points on a rational normal curve in Rd, where n is greater than d. These polytopes were studied by Constantin Carathéodory, David Gale, Theodore Motzkin, Victor Klee, and others. They play an important role in polyhedral combinatorics: according to the upper bound theorem, proved by Peter McMullen and Richard Stanley, the boundary Δ(n,d) of the cyclic polytope C(n,d) maximizes the number fi of i-dimensional faces among all simplicial spheres of dimension d − 1 with n vertices.

Definition 
.

The -dimensional cyclic polytope with  vertices is the convex hull

The combinatorial structure of this polytope is independent of the points chosen, and the resulting polytope  has dimension d and n vertices.  Its boundary is a (d − 1)-dimensional simplicial polytope denoted Δ(n,d).

Gale evenness condition 
The Gale evenness condition provides a necessary and sufficient condition to determine a facet on a cyclic polytope.

Let .

Neighborliness
Cyclic polytopes are examples of neighborly polytopes, in that every set of at most d/2 vertices forms a face. They were the first neighborly polytopes known, and Theodore Motzkin conjectured that all neighborly polytopes are combinatorially equivalent to cyclic polytopes, but this is now known to be false.

Number of faces
The number of i-dimensional faces of the cyclic polytope Δ(n,d) is given by the formula

 

and  completely determine  via the Dehn–Sommerville equations.

Upper bound theorem

The upper bound theorem states that cyclic polytopes have the maximum possible number of faces for a given dimension and number of vertices: if Δ is a simplicial sphere of dimension d − 1 with n vertices, then

 

The upper bound conjecture for simplicial polytopes was proposed by Theodore Motzkin in 1957 and proved by Peter McMullen in 1970.  Victor Klee suggested that the same statement should hold for all simplicial spheres and this was indeed established in 1975 by Richard P. Stanley using the notion of a Stanley–Reisner ring and homological methods.

See also
 Combinatorial commutative algebra

References 

Polyhedral combinatorics